Fighting Trouble is a 1956 American comedy film directed by George Blair and starring The Bowery Boys.  It was released on September 16, 1956, by Allied Artists. The 42nd film in the Bowery Boys series, it was the first to feature Stanley Clements.

Plot
When Danny loses his job working for the New York Morning Blade, Sach and Duke visit the editor to ask him to give Danny his job back. They agree to get a photo of gangster Frankie Arbo for the paper, and try several disguises to catch Arbo in the act before finally deciding to pose as gangsters themselves.

Cast

The Bowery Boys
Huntz Hall as Horace Debussy "Sach" Jones
Stanley Clements as Stanislaus "Duke" Covelske
David Gorcey as Charles "Chuck" Anderson (Credited as David Condon)
Danny Welton as Danny

Remaining cast
Queenie Smith as Mrs. Kate Kelly
Adele Jergens as Mae Randle
Thomas Browne Henry as Frankie Arbo
Tim Ryan as Ray Vance
Joe Downing as Handsome Hal Lomax
Laurie Mitchell as Dolly Tate

Production
With the departure of Leo Gorcey, Hall had become the series' main attraction; thus the group was renamed Huntz Hall and the Bowery Boys with this film. It also marked the first appearance of Stanislaus 'Duke' Covelske, played by Stanley Clements. Other cast changes include Queenie Smith taking over the role of landlady Mrs. Kelly, and the addition of Danny Welton in his only appearance as a member of the gang.

Home media
Warner Archives released the film on made-to-order DVD in the United States as part of "The Bowery Boys, Volume Four" on August 26, 2014.

See also
List of American films of 1956

References

External links

1956 films
1956 comedy films
Allied Artists films
American black-and-white films
Bowery Boys films
Films directed by George Blair
American comedy films
1950s English-language films
1950s American films